Bako is a town in central Ethiopia. Bako is the administrative center of Bako Tibe Aanaa.

During the Italian occupation, Bako is mentioned as having a medical clinic and a school. In 1948, Swedish missionaries opened a medical clinic in the town, which evolved into a mission station by 1953. By 1967, the town had phone service, as well as a primary and junior secondary schools; there was also a school for the blind, which had been moved from Addis Ababa to Bako 1961. The Ethiopian Institute of Agricultural Research opened a center in Bako in 1968, which is the national center for improving the yield of maize.

Based on figures from the Central Statistical Agency in 2005, Bako has an estimated total population of 18,641 of whom 9,370 are men and 9,271 women. The 1994 census reported this town had a total population of 10,422 of whom 5,082 were men and 5,340 women. It is the largest of three towns in Bako Tibe.

Notes 

Cities and towns in Oromia Region